Sam or Sammy White may refer to:

 Sam White (baseball) (1893–1929), American baseball player
 Sam White (film producer) (1906–2006), American film producer
 Sam White (footballer) (1903/1904 – after 1929), English footballer
 Sam White (foreign correspondent) (1913–1988), British journalist
 Sam White (political adviser) (born 1975/1976), British political adviser
 Sammy White (actor) (1894–1960), American actor and comedian
 Sammy White (American football) (born 1954), American football wide receiver
 Sammy White (baseball) (1927–1991), American baseball player
 Clayton Sam White, American physician and brother of associate justice Byron White

See also
 Samuel White (disambiguation)